

Events

Pre-1600
 457 – Leo I becomes the Eastern Roman emperor.
 987 – Bardas Phokas the Younger and Bardas Skleros, Byzantine generals of the military elite, begin a wide-scale rebellion against Emperor Basil II.
1301 – Edward of Caernarvon (later king Edward II of England) becomes the first English Prince of Wales.
1313 – King Thihathu founds the Pinya Kingdom as the de jure successor state of the Pagan Kingdom.
1365 – Albert III of Mecklenburg (King Albert of Sweden) grants city rights to Ulvila.
1497 – In Florence, Italy, supporters of Girolamo Savonarola burn cosmetics, art, and books, in a "Bonfire of the vanities".

1601–1900
1756 – Guaraní War: The leader of the Guaraní rebels, Sepé Tiaraju, is killed in a skirmish with Spanish and Portuguese troops.
1783 – American Revolutionary War: French and Spanish forces lift the Great Siege of Gibraltar.
1795 – The 11th Amendment to the United States Constitution is ratified.
1807 – Napoleonic Wars: Napoleon finds Bennigsen's Russian forces taking a stand at Eylau. After bitter fighting, the French take the town, but the Russians resume the battle the next day.
1812 – The strongest in a series of earthquakes strikes New Madrid, Missouri.
1813 – In the action of 7 February 1813 near the Îles de Los, the frigates Aréthuse and Amelia batter each other, but neither can gain the upper hand.
1819 – Sir Thomas Stamford Raffles leaves Singapore after just taking it over, leaving it in the hands of William Farquhar.
1842 – Battle of Debre Tabor: Ras Ali Alula, Regent of the Emperor of Ethiopia defeats warlord Wube Haile Maryam of Semien.
1854 – A law is approved to found the Swiss Federal Institute of Technology. Lectures started October 16, 1855.
1863 –  sinks off the coast of Auckland, New Zealand, killing 189.
1894 – The Cripple Creek miner's strike, led by the Western Federation of Miners, begins in Cripple Creek, Colorado, United States.
1898 – Dreyfus affair: Émile Zola is brought to trial for libel for publishing J'Accuse…!
1900 – Second Boer War: British troops fail in their third attempt to lift the Siege of Ladysmith.
  1900   – A Chinese immigrant in San Francisco falls ill to bubonic plague in the first plague epidemic in the continental United States.

1901–present
1904 – A fire begins in Baltimore, Maryland; it destroys over 1,500 buildings in 30 hours.
1940 – The second full-length animated Walt Disney film, Pinocchio, premieres.
1943 – World War II: Imperial Japanese Navy forces complete the evacuation of Imperial Japanese Army troops from Guadalcanal during Operation Ke, ending Japanese attempts to retake the island from Allied forces in the Guadalcanal Campaign.
1944 – World War II: In Anzio, Italy, German forces launch a counteroffensive during the Allied Operation Shingle.
1951 – Korean War: More than 700 suspected communist sympathizers are massacred by South Korean forces.
1962 – The United States bans all Cuban imports and exports.
1974 – Grenada gains independence from the United Kingdom.
1979 – Pluto moves inside Neptune's orbit for the first time since either was discovered.
1984 – Space Shuttle program: STS-41-B Mission: Astronauts Bruce McCandless II and Robert L. Stewart make the first untethered space walk using the Manned Maneuvering Unit (MMU).
1986 – Twenty-eight years of one-family rule end in Haiti, when President Jean-Claude Duvalier flees the Caribbean nation.
1990 – Dissolution of the Soviet Union: The Central Committee of the Soviet Communist Party agrees to give up its monopoly on power.
1991 – Haiti's first democratically elected president, Jean-Bertrand Aristide, is sworn in.
  1991   – The Troubles: The Provisional IRA launches a mortar attack on 10 Downing Street in London, the headquarters of the British government.
1992 – The Maastricht Treaty is signed, leading to the creation of the European Union.
1995 – Ramzi Yousef, the mastermind of the 1993 World Trade Center bombing, is arrested in Islamabad, Pakistan.
1999 – Crown Prince Abdullah becomes the King of Jordan on the death of his father, King Hussein.
2001 – Space Shuttle program: Space Shuttle Atlantis is launched on mission STS-98, carrying the Destiny laboratory module to the International Space Station.
2009 – Bushfires in Victoria leave 173 dead in the worst natural disaster in Australia's history.
2012 – President Mohamed Nasheed of the Republic of Maldives resigns, after 23 days of anti-governmental protests calling for the release of the Chief Judge unlawfully arrested by the military.
2013 – The U.S. state of Mississippi officially certifies the Thirteenth Amendment, becoming the last state to approve the abolition of slavery. The Thirteenth Amendment was formally ratified by Mississippi in 1995.
2014 – Scientists announce that the Happisburgh footprints in Norfolk, England, date back to more than 800,000 years ago, making them the oldest known hominid footprints outside Africa.
2016 – North Korea launches Kwangmyŏngsŏng-4 into outer space violating multiple UN treaties and prompting condemnation from around the world.
2021 – The 2021 Uttarakhand flood begins.

Births

Pre-1600
 574 – Prince Shōtoku of Japan (d. 622)
1102 – Empress Matilda, Holy Roman Empress and claimant to the English throne (probable; d. 1167)
1478 – Thomas More, English lawyer and politician, Lord Chancellor of England (d. 1535)
1487 – Queen Dangyeong, Korean royal consort (d. 1557)
1500 – João de Castro, viceroy of Portuguese India (d. 1548)

1601–1900
1612 – Thomas Killigrew, English playwright and manager (d. 1683)
1622 – Vittoria della Rovere, Italian noble (d. 1694)
1693 – Empress Anna of Russia (d. 1740)
1722 – Azar Bigdeli, Iranian anthologist and poet (d. 1781)
1726 – Margaret Fownes-Luttrell, English painter (d. 1766)
1741 – Henry Fuseli, Swiss-English painter and academic (d. 1825)
1758 – Benedikt Schack, Czech tenor and composer (d. 1826)
1796 – Thomas Gregson, English-Australian lawyer and politician, 2nd Premier of Tasmania (baptism date; d. 1874)
1802 – Louisa Jane Hall, American poet, essayist, and literary critic (d. 1892)
1804 – John Deere, American blacksmith and businessman, founded Deere & Company (d. 1886)
1812 – Charles Dickens, English novelist and critic (d. 1870)
1825 – Karl Möbius, German zoologist and ecologist (d. 1908)
1834 – Alfred-Philibert Aldrophe, French architect (d. 1895)
1837 – James Murray, Scottish lexicographer and philologist (d. 1915)
1864 – Arthur Collins, American baritone singer (d. 1933)
1867 – Laura Ingalls Wilder, American author (d. 1957)
1870 – Alfred Adler, Austrian-Scottish psychologist and therapist (d. 1937)
1871 – Wilhelm Stenhammar, Swedish pianist, composer, and conductor (d. 1927)
1873 – Thomas Andrews, Irish shipbuilder and businessman, designed the RMS Titanic (d. 1912)
1875 – Erkki Melartin, Finnish composer (d. 1937)
1877 – G. H. Hardy, English mathematician and geneticist (d. 1947)
1878 – Ossip Gabrilowitsch, Russian-American pianist and conductor (d. 1936)
1885 – Sinclair Lewis, American novelist, short-story writer, and playwright, Nobel Prize laureate (d. 1951)
  1885   – Hugo Sperrle, German field marshal (d. 1953)
1887 – Eubie Blake, American pianist and composer (d. 1983)
1889 – Harry Nyquist, Swedish-American engineer and theorist (d. 1976)
1893 – Joseph Algernon Pearce, Canadian astrophysicist and astronomer (d. 1988)
  1893   – Nicanor Abelardo, Filipino pianist, composer and teacher (d. 1934)
1895 – Anita Stewart, American actress (d. 1961)

1901–present
1901 – Arnold Nordmeyer, New Zealand minister and politician, 30th New Zealand Minister of Finance (d. 1989)
1904 – Ernest E. Debs, American politician (d. 2002)
1905 – Paul Nizan, French philosopher and author (d. 1940)
  1905   – Ulf von Euler, Swedish physiologist and academic, Nobel Prize laureate (d. 1983)
1906 – Puyi, Chinese emperor (d. 1967)
  1906   – Oleg Antonov, Russian engineer, founded the Antonov Aircraft Company (d. 1984)
1908 – Buster Crabbe, American swimmer and actor (d. 1983)
  1908   – Manmath Nath Gupta, Indian journalist and author (d. 2000)
1909 – Hélder Câmara, Brazilian archbishop (d. 1999)
  1909   – Amedeo Guillet, Italian soldier (d. 2010)
1912 – Russell Drysdale, English-Australian painter (d. 1981)
  1912   – Roberta McCain, American socialite and oil heiress (d. 2020)
1915 – Teoctist Arăpașu, Romanian patriarch (d. 2007)
  1915   – Eddie Bracken, American actor and singer (d. 2002)
1916 – Frank Hyde, Australian rugby league player, coach, and sportscaster (d. 2007)
1919 – Jock Mahoney, American actor and stuntman (d. 1989)
  1919   – Desmond Doss, American army corporal and combat medic, Medal of Honor recipient (d. 2006)
1920 – Oscar Brand, Canadian-American singer-songwriter and author (d. 2016)
  1920   – An Wang, Chinese-American engineer and businessman, founded Wang Laboratories (d. 1990)
1921 – Athol Rowan, South African cricketer (d. 1998)
1922 – Hattie Jacques, English actress (d. 1980)
1923 – Dora Bryan, English actress and restaurateur (d. 2014)
1925 – Hans Schmidt, Canadian wrestler (d. 2012)
1926 – Konstantin Feoktistov, Russian engineer and astronaut (d. 2009)
1927 – Juliette Gréco, French singer and actress (d. 2020)
  1927   – Vladimir Kuts, Ukrainian-Russian runner and coach (d. 1975)
  1927   – Lalo Ríos, Mexican actor (d. 1973)
1928 – Lincoln D. Faurer, American general (d. 2014)
1929 – Jim Langley, English international footballer and manager (d. 2007)
1932 – Gay Talese, American journalist and memoirist
  1932   – Alfred Worden, American colonel, pilot, and astronaut (d. 2020)
1933 – K. N. Choksy, Sri Lankan lawyer and politician, Sri Lankan Minister of Finance (d. 2015)
1934 – Eddie Fenech Adami, Maltese lawyer and politician, 7th President of Malta
  1934   – King Curtis, American saxophonist and producer (d. 1971)
  1934   – Earl King, American singer-songwriter, guitarist, and producer (d. 2003)
1935 – Cliff Jones, Welsh international footballer
  1935   – Herb Kohl, American businessman and politician
  1935   – Jörg Schneider, Swiss actor and author (d. 2015)
1936 – Jas Gawronski, Italian journalist and politician
1937 – Peter Jay, English economist, journalist, and diplomat, British Ambassador to the United States
  1937   – Juan Pizarro, Puerto Rican baseball player (d. 2021)
1940 – Tony Tan, Singaporean academic and politician, 7th President of Singapore
1942 – Gareth Hunt, English actor (d. 2007)
1943 – Eric Foner, American historian, author, and academic
1945 – Gerald Davies, Welsh rugby player and journalist
1946 – Héctor Babenco, Argentinian-Brazilian director, producer, and screenwriter (d. 2016)
  1946   – Pete Postlethwaite, English actor (d. 2011)
  1946   – Gérard Jean-Juste, Haitian priest and activist (d. 2009)
1949 – Jacques Duchesneau, Canadian police officer and politician
1950 – Karen Joy Fowler, American author
1953 – Robert Brazile, American football player
1954 – Dieter Bohlen, German singer-songwriter and producer 
1955 – Rolf Benirschke, American football player and game show host
  1955   – Miguel Ferrer, American actor and director (d. 2017)
1956 – John Nielsen, Danish racing driver
  1956   – Mark St. John, American guitarist (d. 2007)
1958 – Giuseppe Baresi, Italian footballer and manager
  1958   – Terry Marsh, English boxer and politician
  1958   – Matt Ridley, English journalist, author, and politician
1959 – Mick McCarthy, English footballer, manager, and sportscaster
1960 – Robert Smigel, American actor, producer, and screenwriter
  1960   – James Spader, American actor and producer
1962 – Garth Brooks, American singer-songwriter and guitarist
  1962   – David Bryan, American keyboard player and songwriter 
  1962   – Eddie Izzard, English comedian, actor, and producer
1963 – Heidemarie Stefanyshyn-Piper, American Naval officer and astronaut
1964 – Ashok Banker, Indian journalist, author, and screenwriter
1965 – Chris Rock, American actor, director, producer, and screenwriter
1966 – Kristin Otto, German swimmer
1968 – Peter Bondra, Ukrainian-Slovak ice hockey player and manager
  1968   – Mark Tewksbury, Canadian swimmer and sportscaster
1969 – Andrew Micallef, Maltese painter and musician
1971 – Anita Tsoy, Russian singer-songwriter
1972 – Robyn Lively, American actress
1973 – Juwan Howard, American basketball player and coach
1974 – J Dilla, American rapper and producer (d. 2006)
  1974   – Nujabes, Japanese record producer, DJ, composer and arranger (d. 2010)
  1974   – Steve Nash, South African-Canadian basketball player
1975 – Wes Borland, American singer-songwriter and guitarist
  1975   – Miriam Corowa, Australian journalist, television presenter and producer
  1975   – Alexandre Daigle, Canadian ice hockey player
  1975   – Rémi Gaillard, French comedian and actor
1976 – Chito Miranda, Filipino singer-songwriter 
1977 – Tsuneyasu Miyamoto, Japanese footballer
1978 – David Aebischer, Swiss ice hockey player
  1978   – Endy Chávez, Venezuelan baseball player
  1978   – Ashton Kutcher, American model, actor, producer, and entrepreneur
  1978   – Daniel Van Buyten, Belgian football player
1979 – Daniel Bierofka, German footballer and coach
  1979   – Tawakkol Karman, Yemeni journalist and activist, Nobel Prize laureate
  1979   – Sam J. Miller, American author
1981 – Darcy Dolce Neto, Brazilian footballer
  1981   – Lee Ok-sung, South Korean boxer
1982 – Mohammed Bijeh, Iranian serial killer (d. 2006)
1982 – Osamu Mukai, Japanese actor
  1982   – Mickaël Piétrus, French basketball player
1983 – Sho Kamogawa, Japanese footballer
  1983   – Federico Marchetti, Italian footballer
1984 – Trey Hardee, American decathlete
1985 – Tina Majorino, American actress
  1985   – Deborah Ann Woll, American actress
1988 – Ai Kago, Japanese singer and actress 
  1988   – Matthew Stafford, American football player
1989 – Nick Calathes, Greek basketball player
  1989   – Elia Viviani, Italian cyclist
1990 – Jacksepticeye, Irish YouTuber
  1990   – Gianluca Lapadula, Italian footballer
  1990   – Dalilah Muhammad, American hurdler
  1990   – Steven Stamkos, Canadian ice hockey player
1991 – Ryan O'Reilly, Canadian ice hockey player
1992 – Sergi Roberto, Spanish footballer
  1992   – Ksenia Stolbova, Russian figure skater
  1992   – Maimi Yajima, Japanese singer and actress 
1993 – Chris Mears, English diver
1994 – Riley Barber, American ice hockey player
1995 – Roberto Osuna, Mexican baseball player
1996 – Pierre Gasly, French racing driver
1997 – Nicolò Barella, Italian footballer
  1997   – Anhelina Kalinina, Ukrainian tennis player

Deaths

Pre-1600
 199 – Lü Bu, Chinese warlord
 318 – Jin Mindi, emperor of the Jin Dynasty (b. 300)
999 – Boleslaus II the Pious, Duke of Bohemia (b. 932)
1045 – Emperor Go-Suzaku of Japan (b. 1009)
1065 – Siegfried I, Count of Sponheim (b. c. 1010)
1127 – Ava, German poet (b. 1060)
1165 – Marshal Stephen of Armenia
1259 – Thomas, Count of Flanders
1317 – Robert, Count of Clermont (b. 1256)
1320 – Jan Muskata, Bishop of Kraków (b. 1250)
1333 – Nikko, Japanese priest, founder of Nichiren Shoshu Buddhism (b. 1246)
1520 – Alfonsina de' Medici, Regent of Florence (b. 1472)
1560 – Bartolommeo Bandinelli, Florentine sculptor (b. 1493)

1601–1900
1603 – Bartholomäus Sastrow, German politician (b. 1520)
1626 – William V, Duke of Bavaria (b. 1548)
1642 – William Bedell, English bishop and academic (b. 1571)
1693 – Paul Pellisson, French lawyer and author (b. 1624)
1736 – Stephen Gray, English astronomer and physicist (b. 1666)
1779 – William Boyce, English organist and composer (b. 1711)
1799 – Qianlong Emperor of China (b. 1711)
1801 – Daniel Chodowiecki, Polish-German painter and academic (b. 1726)
1819 – August Wilhelm Hupel, German-Estonian linguist and author (b. 1737)
1823 – Ann Radcliffe, English author (b. 1764)
1837 – Gustav IV Adolf of Sweden (b. 1778)
1849 – Mariano Paredes, Mexican general and 16th president (1845-1846) (b. 1797)
1862 – Francisco de Paula Martínez de la Rosa y Berdejo, Spanish playwright and politician, Prime Minister of Spain (b. 1787)
1864 – Vuk Karadžić, Serbian philologist and linguist (b. 1787)
1871 – Henry E. Steinway, German-American businessman, founded Steinway & Sons (b. 1797)
1873 – Sheridan Le Fanu, Irish author (b. 1814)
1878 – Pope Pius IX (b. 1792)
1891 – Marie Louise Andrews, American story writer and journalist  (b. 1849)
1897 – Galileo Ferraris, Italian physicist and engineer (b. 1847)

1901–present
1919 – William Halford, English-American lieutenant, Medal of Honor recipient (b. 1841)
1920 – Alexander Kolchak, Russian admiral and explorer (b. 1874)
  1920   – Charles Langelier, Canadian journalist, judge, and politician (b. 1850)
1921 – John J. Gardner, American politician (b. 1845)
1937 – Elihu Root, American lawyer and politician, 38th United States Secretary of State, Nobel Prize laureate (b. 1845)
1938 – Harvey Samuel Firestone, American businessman, founded the Firestone Tire and Rubber Company (b. 1868)
1939 – Boris Grigoriev, Russian painter and illustrator (b. 1886)
1940 – James McCormick (Irish republican), Executed Irish Republican (b. 1910)
  1940   – Peter Barnes (Irish republican), Executed Irish Republican (b. 1907)
1942 – Ivan Bilibin, Russian illustrator and stage designer (b. 1876)
1944 – Lina Cavalieri, Italian soprano and actress (b. 1874)
1959 – Nap Lajoie, American baseball player and manager (b. 1874)
  1959   – Daniel François Malan, South African minister and politician, 5th Prime Minister of South Africa (b. 1874)
  1959   – Guitar Slim, American singer and guitarist (b. 1926)
1960 – Igor Kurchatov, Russian physicist and academic (b. 1903)
1963 – Learco Guerra, Italian cyclist and manager (b. 1902)
1964 – Sofoklis Venizelos, Greek captain and politician, 133rd Prime Minister of Greece (b. 1894)
1968 – Nick Adams, American actor and screenwriter (b. 1931)
1972 – Walter Lang, American director and screenwriter (b. 1896)
1979 – Josef Mengele, German SS officer and physician (b. 1911)
1986 – Cheikh Anta Diop, Senegalese historian, anthropologist, and physicist (b. 1923)
1990 – Alan Perlis, American computer scientist and academic (b. 1922)
  1990   – Alfredo M. Santos, Filipino general (b. 1905)
1991 – Amos Yarkoni, Israeli colonel (b. 1920)
1994 – Witold Lutosławski, Polish composer and conductor (b. 1913)
1999 – King Hussein of Jordan (b. 1935)
  1999   – Bobby Troup, American actor, pianist, and composer (b. 1918)
2000 – Doug Henning, Canadian magician and politician (b. 1947)
2001 – Anne Morrow Lindbergh, American author and pilot (b. 1906)
2003 – Augusto Monterroso, Guatemalan author (b. 1921)
2005 – Atli Dam, Faroese engineer and politician, 5th Prime Minister of the Faroe Islands (b. 1932)
2006 – Princess Durru Shehvar of the Ottoman Empire (b. 1914)
2009 – Blossom Dearie, American singer and pianist (b. 1924)
2010 – Franco Ballerini, Italian cyclist and coach (b. 1964)
2012 – Harry Keough, American soccer player and coach (b. 1927)
2013 – Krsto Papić, Croatian director and screenwriter (b. 1933)
2014 – Doug Mohns, Canadian-American ice hockey player (b. 1933)
2015 – Billy Casper, American golfer (b. 1931)
  2015   – Marshall Rosenberg, American psychologist and author (b. 1934)
  2015   – Dean Smith, American basketball player and coach (b. 1931) 
  2015   – John C. Whitehead, American banker and politician, 9th United States Deputy Secretary of State (b. 1922)
2017 – Richard Hatch, American actor (b. 1945)
  2017   – Hans Rosling, Swedish academic (b. 1948)
  2017   – Tzvetan Todorov, Bulgarian philosopher (b. 1939)
2019 – John Dingell, American politician (b. 1926)
  2019   – Albert Finney, English actor (b. 1936)
  2019   – Jan Olszewski, Polish politician, 3rd Prime Minister (b. 1930)
  2019   – Frank Robinson, American baseball player, coach, and manager (b. 1935)
2020 – Li Wenliang, Chinese ophthalmologist who initially warned about COVID-19 (b. 1986)

Holidays and observances
Christian feast day:
Richard the Pilgrim
Blessed Eugénie Smet
Blessed Pope Pius IX
Chrysolius
Egidio Maria of Saint Joseph
February 7 (Eastern Orthodox liturgics)
New Martyrs and Confessors of the Russian Orthodox Church Typically observed on the Sunday closest to January 25 (O.S.)/February 7 (N.S.)
Independence Day (Grenada), celebrates the independence of Grenada from the United Kingdom in 1974.
National Black HIV/AIDS Awareness Day (United States)

References

External links

 BBC: On This Day
 
 Historical Events on February 9

Days of the year
February